Wladyslaw Soporek (born 10 December 1927 in Grodzisk Mazowiecki - died 25 October 1986 in Łódź) was a Polish footballer player and coach.

Soporek, whose first team was a local side TUR Grodzisk, spent the best years of his career in ŁKS Łódź, where he won the 1958 championship of Poland. A forward, he was the top scorer of the Ekstraklasa in the same year, with 18 goals. Apart from ŁKS (1953–1960), he also played for Legia Warsaw (1950–1952), Lublinianka Lublin (1949–1950), and finished active playing in Start Łódź (1961–1964).

He twice capped for Poland, without scoring a goal.

References

1927 births
1986 deaths
People from Grodzisk Mazowiecki
Sportspeople from Masovian Voivodeship
Association football forwards
Polish footballers
Poland international footballers
Legia Warsaw players
ŁKS Łódź players
Ekstraklasa players
Pogoń Grodzisk Mazowiecki players